Tihomir Franković (born 30 September 1970) is a Croatian rower who won a bronze medal in the eights competition at the 2000 Summer Olympics in Sydney. His teammates were Igor Boraska, Nikša Skelin, Siniša Skelin, Branimir Vujević, Krešimir Čuljak, Tomislav Smoljanović and Igor Francetić.

He was a world record (world's best time) holder, for 20 years, in a coxed pair event set at 1994 World rowing championship.

External links
databaseOlympic.com

1970 births
Living people
Croatian male rowers
Rowers at the 1996 Summer Olympics
Rowers at the 2000 Summer Olympics
Olympic rowers of Croatia
Olympic bronze medalists for Croatia
Olympic medalists in rowing
Medalists at the 2000 Summer Olympics